The Laurence Olivier Award for Best New Play is an annual award presented by the Society of London Theatre in recognition of achievements in commercial London theatre. The awards were established as the Society of West End Theatre Awards in 1976, and renamed in 1984 in honour of English actor and director Laurence Olivier.

The award was titled Play of the Year from its establishment in 1976, and was first retitled to its current name for the 2001 Olivier Awards.

Winners and nominees

1970s

1980s

1990s

2000s

2010s

2020s

Multiple awards and nominations for Best New Play

Awards
Two awards
David Hare
Martin McDonagh
Simon Stephens
Tom Stoppard

Nominations
Seven nominations
David Hare
Tom Stoppard

Three nominations
Athol Fugard
James Graham
Christopher Hampton
Conor McPherson
Martin McDonagh
Peter Morgan

Two nominations
Jez Butterworth
David Edgar
Michael Frayn
Brian Friel
Pam Gems
Ronald Harwood
Terry Johnson
Julian Mitchell
Frank McGuinness
Simon Stephens

See also
 Critics' Circle Theatre Award for Best New Play
 Evening Standard Theatre Award for Best Play
 Tony Award for Best Play

References

External links
 

Play